The Adult Top 40 chart is published weekly by Billboard magazine and ranks "the most popular adult top 40 as based on radio airplay detections measured by Nielsen BDS." The chart was first published in the March 16, 1996, issue of Billboard; however, historically, the chart's introduction was in October 1995, when it began as a test chart.

The Adult Top 40 chart was formed following a split of the "Hot Adult Contemporary" chart due to the growing emergence of Adult Top 40 radio stations in the 1990s. These stations played a wider variety of artists and saw a faster turnover of songs compared to traditional adult contemporary radio. Songs by modern rock, dance, and R&B artists were mixed in with acts more closely associated with adult contemporary. According to Billboard, splitting the chart "better reflect[s] the music being played on adult contemporary and adult/top 40 stations."

Chart history
 – Year-end number-one single

A  "Smooth" spent the last 10 weeks of 1999 and the first 15 weeks of 2000 at number one

See also
 1990s in music

References

Lists of number-one songs in the United States
United States Adult Top 40
1990s in American music